The Judith Wright Arts Centre, formerly the Judith Wright Centre of Contemporary Arts, is a visual and performing arts centre in Fortitude Valley in Brisbane, Queensland.  The venue was renovated and re-opened as an arts centre in October 2001. The Centre is named after Judith Wright, who was a celebrated Queensland poet, an advocate for Indigenous rights, and an environmental activist. Wright was one of two Australian poets considered for the Nobel Prize for Literature. She died on 25 June 2000 in Canberra.

The Centre is managed by the Queensland Government through Arts Queensland. Affectionately called The Judy, it is located at corner of Berwick Street and 420 Brunswick Street in Fortitude Valley.

The venue includes well-equipped performance spaces with three rehearsal studios for dance, theatre and music. The main performance space is a flexible "black box" theatre with plenty of scope for diverse types of performances.  The venue encompasses a two-storey and a five-storey buildings. The larger structure was originally a factory for Bushell's Tea.  Redevelopment of the site was designed by Cox Architects and built by Multiplex Constructions.

The Centre is home to several creative and cultural organisations, including the Aboriginal Centre for the Performing Arts, Artour, the Australasian Dance Collective, Blakdance, Carbon Creative, Circa Contemporary Circus, Creative Partnerships Australia, Flying Arts Alliance, Institute of Modern Art, and Musica Viva.

Each year, the venue hosts the Queensland Poetry Festival. It hosted the contemporary music event, BIGSOUND, from 2002 until 2018.

See also

Culture of Brisbane

References

External links
Judith Wright Arts Centre
Aboriginal Centre for the Performing Arts
Artour
AusDance Queensland
Australasian Dance Collective 
BlakDance
Carbon Creative 
Circa Contemporary Circus
Creative Partnerships Australia

Flying Arts alliance Inc.
The Institute of Modern Art
Musica Viva

Performing arts centres in Australia
Theatres in Brisbane
Dance venues in Australia
Organisations serving Indigenous Australians
Arts organizations established in 2001
2001 establishments in Australia
Culture of Brisbane
Tourist attractions in Brisbane